The Indonesia national women's cricket team is the team that represents Indonesia in international women's cricket. The team made its international debut in January 2019 at the 2019 Thailand Women's T20 Smash in Bangkok. 

In April 2018, the International Cricket Council (ICC) granted full Women's Twenty20 International (WT20I) status to all its members. Therefore, all Twenty20 matches played between Indonesia women and other ICC members since 1 July 2018 have been a full WT20I.

History
In December 2020, the ICC announced the qualification pathway for the 2023 ICC Women's T20 World Cup. Indonesia was named in the 2021 ICC Women's T20 World Cup EAP Qualifier regional group, alongside seven other teams.

In January 2023 it was announced that Indonesia and Japan would be included in Asian Cricket Council (ACC) pathway events, while remaining in the ICC East Asia-Pacific development region.

Records and statistics 
International Match Summary — Indonesia Women
 
Last updated 9 November 2022

Twenty20 International 
 Highest team total: 260/1 v. Philippines, 21 December 2019 at Friendship Oval, Dasmariñas 
 Highest individual score: 112, Yulia Anggraeni v. Philippines, 21 December 2019 at Friendship Oval, Dasmariñas  
 Best individual bowling figures: 5/5, Agung Laksmi v. Philippines, 21 December 2019 at Friendship Oval, Dasmariñas  

Most T20I runs for Indonesia Women

Most T20I wickets for Indonesia Women

T20I record versus other nations

Records complete to WT20I #1291. Last updated 9 November 2022.

See also
 List of Indonesia women Twenty20 International cricketers

References

Women's
Women's national cricket teams
Cricket